Jung Il-woo (born 28 March 1986) is a South Korean athlete specialising in the shot put. He won a bronze medal at the 2017 Asian Indoor and Martial Arts Games.

His personal bests in the event are 19.49 metres outdoors (Sapporo 2015) and 19.24 metres indoors (Ashgabat 2017). Both are current national records.

International competitions

References

1986 births
Living people
South Korean male shot putters
Athletes (track and field) at the 2010 Asian Games
Athletes (track and field) at the 2014 Asian Games
Athletes (track and field) at the 2018 Asian Games
Asian Games competitors for South Korea
21st-century South Korean people